
Gmina Ośno Lubuskie is an urban-rural gmina (administrative district) in Słubice County, Lubusz Voivodeship, in western Poland.

Villages
Apart from the town of Ośno Lubuskie, Gmina Ośno Lubuskie contains the villages and settlements of Grabno, Gronów, Kochań, Lipienica, Lubień, Podośno, Połęcko, Radachów, Rosławice, Sienno, Smogóry, Świniary, Trześniów and Wysokie Dęby.

Neighbouring gminas
Gmina Ośno Lubuskie is bordered by the gminas of Górzyca, Krzeszyce, Rzepin, Słońsk, Sulęcin and Torzym.

Twin towns – sister cities

Gmina Ośno Lubuskie is twinned with:
 Aalborg, Denmark
 Eichwalde, Germany

References

Osno Lubuskie
Słubice County